The month names in Turkish are derived from three languages: either from Latin, Levantine Arabic (which itself took its names from Aramaic), or from a genuine Turkish word. The Arabic-Aramaic month names themselves originate in the ancient Babylonian calendar, and are therefore cognate with the names of months in the Hebrew calendar, specifically Shevat, Nisan, Tammuz and Elul. The original Babylonian months were actual lunar months, as the Hebrew months of the same names are to this day, much like months in the Islamic calendar. Turkey has used Gregorian AD year numbering officially since 1926, though Gregorian calendar dates were in use since March 1917. The names of the months from February to September had been used in the now abandoned Rumi calendar, with the other four still retaining their old Arabic/Aramaic names. In 1945, three of them received names of Turkish origin.

See also
 Islamic calendar
 Arabic names of calendar months
 Rumi calendar
 Hebrew calendar
 Babylonian calendar

References

Months
Turkish language